Flach may refer to:

People
 Émile Flach (1853–1926), Monacan politician
 Doug Flach (born 1970), American tennis player
 Thomas Flach (born 1956), German sailing Olympic champion
 Ken Flach (1963–2018), American tennis player
 Peter Flach (born 1961), Dutch computer scientist
 Tim Flach (born 1958), British photographer
 Karl-Hermann Flach (1929–1973), German journalist and politician
 Matthias Flach (rower) (born 1982), German rower
 Matthias Flach (mathematician) (born 1963), German mathematician
 Igor Flach (1966–2008), German musician
 Frederic Flach (1927–2006), psychologist
 Jakob Flach (1894–1982), Swiss painter
 Geoffroi Jacques Flach (1846–1919), French jurist and historian

Other uses
 Flachsee, an artificial lake in Rottenschwil, Switzerland
 Flach (submarine), a Chilean submarine